Abdounodus ("Abdoun tooth") is an extinct genus of mammal known from the middle Paleocene of northern Africa. The sole species, A. hamdii, is known from teeth discovered in the Ouled Abdoun Basin of present-day Morocco in 2001. Traditionally considered a mioclaenid "condylarth", recent studies place it as a basal afrothere closely related to Ocepeia, demonstrating the close convergent evolution between perissodactyls and herbivorous afrotheres and bridging paenungulates with other afrotheres.

References

Paleocene mammals of Africa
Fossils of Morocco
Fossil taxa described in 2001
Paleocene mammals
Prehistoric placental genera